Cecciolo Gabrielli (1375 - June 26, 1420) was an Italian nobleman, self-styled Duke of Gubbio (Duca di Gubbio or Duca d'Agobbio).

With the help of the condottieri Braccio da Montone, he tried to reconquer Gubbio which had been lost by his family in 1384, following the defeat of his great-uncle, the bishop Gabriello Gabrielli. He was however captured by Guidantonio da Montefeltro at Serra Sant'Abbondio and hanged from the door of the Ponte Marmoreo (Marble Bridge) at Gubbio.

Before dying he shouted "Gubbio patria nostra" (Gubbio our fatherland), which eventually became one of the mottos of his family.

1375 births
1420 deaths
People from Gubbio
Italian nobility